François-Henri Désérable (born Amiens, France, 6 February 1987) is a French author and a former professional ice hockey player.

Literature 

His first book, Tu montreras ma tête au peuple, short-stories about the French revolution, was released in April 2013 by Gallimard and won multiple literary awards.

Two years later, he published Évariste, a novel about Évariste Galois, French mathematician who revolutionized algebra and died at age 20 from wounds suffered in a duel. In France, the book was considered as one of the "literary sensations of the year 2015".

Un certain M. Piekielny, literary investigation around a character invented by Romain Gary, was the only novel selected for the six major French literary prizes in 2017. 

In Mon maître et mon vainqueur (2021), he dissects the mechanisms of passionate love. This novel won the Grand Prix du roman de l'Académie française.

His novels are translated into a dozen languages.

Hockey career 

François-Henri Désérable was also a professional ice-hockey player.

In 2002-03, he played for Wayzata High School, in the American state of Minnesota.

Coming from the junior team of the Gothiques d'Amiens, with which he had won, in 2007, the French junior championship, he made his senior debut with LHC Les Lions in 2008. In April 2011, he helped the Lions reach the final of the French D2 championship, moving the team up to Division 1. The same year, he was selected among the finalists of the Lions du Sport in the category Best Athlete in Lyon.

He then played two seasons with the Montpellier Vipers, before moving to Paris where he played one more season with the Français Volants before hanging up his skates in 2016, at age 29.

Bibliography

References

External links
Blog of François-Henri Désérable
François-Henri Désérable on Gallimard's website
Montpellier Vipers

French ice hockey players
1987 births
Living people
Writers from Hauts-de-France
Gothiques d'Amiens players
French male writers
Sportspeople from Amiens
Grand Prix du roman de l'Académie française winners
French expatriate sportspeople in the United States
Expatriate ice hockey players in the United States
French expatriate ice hockey people